Sylvia Rodriguez Garcia (born September 6, 1950) is an American lawyer and politician who has been serving as the U.S. representative for Texas's 29th congressional district since 2019. Her district covers much of eastern Houston. A member of the Democratic Party, she previously represented the 6th district in the Texas Senate.

Early life and education
Sylvia Rodriguez Garcia was born in San Diego, Texas, and raised in Palito Blanco in west central Jim Wells County, the daughter of Luis and Antonia Rodriguez Garcia. She is the eighth of ten children. Her family are Mexican Americans.

After graduating from Ben Bolt-Palito Blanco High School, Garcia attended Texas Woman's University on a scholarship. She graduated with a degree in social work and began a career as a social worker. She later received her Doctor of Jurisprudence degree from Texas Southern University Thurgood Marshall School of Law.

Early political career

City of Houston
In the early 1980s, Houston Mayor Kathryn Whitmire appointed Garcia as presiding judge of the Houston Municipal System. She served for an unprecedented five terms under two mayors.

In 1998, Garcia became Houston city controller.

Harris County
Garcia was elected to the Harris County Commissioner's Court in 2002. She was the first woman and first Latina elected to that post in her own right. Her precinct featured a major base of operations for NASA, the nation's largest petrochemical complex, the Houston Ship Channel and the Port of Houston, the sixth largest port in the world.

In 2010, Garcia was defeated for reelection to the Harris County Commissioner's Court by Republican Jack Morman.

Texas Senate
In 2013, Garcia defeated State Representative Carol Alvarado in a special election runoff to replace the late state Senator Mario Gallegos.

Garcia took the oath of office for state senator on March 11, 2013. She served on the Criminal Justice, Intergovernmental Relations, Natural Resources and Economic Development, and Transportation committees. Garcia ran unopposed in the 2016 general election.

U. S. House of Representatives

Elections

1992 

While still serving as a municipal judge, Garcia ran in the Democratic primary for the newly created 29th congressional seat in 1992. She finished third in the five-way primary behind City Councilman Ben Reyes and State Senator Gene Green. Green won the runoff and held the seat for 26 years.

2018 

Green announced his retirement in November 2017, and Garcia—who by then held the state senate seat Green once held—entered a crowded seven-way Democratic primary. The district was still a Democratic stronghold, and it was taken for granted that whoever won the primary would be overwhelmingly favored in November. Garcia got a significant boost when Green endorsed her, saying, "she's a legislator, and that's what a member of Congress should be." She won the primary with 63% of the vote. Her Republican opponent, Phillip Aronoff, used sexual harassment and wrongful termination allegations against Garcia. Garcia handily won the November 6 general election. She and Veronica Escobar became the first Latina congresswomen from Texas, and Garcia is the first woman to represent the district. Garcia is also the first Hispanic to represent a significant portion of Houston in Congress.

2020 

Garcia won reelection in 2020, defeating Republican Jaimy Blanco.

Tenure

On January 15, 2020, Garcia was selected as one of seven House impeachment managers who presented the impeachment case against President Donald Trump during his trial before the United States Senate.

Committee assignments 

 Committee on Financial Services
 Subcommittee on Diversity and Inclusion
 Subcommittee on Oversight and Investigations
 Committee on the Judiciary
 Subcommittee on the Constitution, Civil Rights and Civil Liberties
 Subcommittee on Immigration and Citizenship

Caucus memberships 

 Congressional Hispanic Caucus
 Congressional Homelessness Caucus
 Congressional Progressive Caucus
 Congressional Pro-Choice Caucus 
 Congressional Mental Health Caucus
 Congressional Social Work Caucus
 Congressional Diabetes Caucus
 Adoption Caucus
 Congressional Bipartisan HBCU Caucus

Electoral history

Positions

LGBT rights
Garcia supports the Equality Act, a bill that would expand the federal Civil Rights Act of 1964 to ban discrimination based on sexual orientation and gender identity. She voted for it in 2019.

See also
List of Hispanic/Latino American jurists
List of Hispanic and Latino Americans in the United States Congress
Women in the United States House of Representatives

References

External links

 Congresswoman Sylvia Garcia official U.S. House website
 Sylvia Garcia for Congress campaign website

|-

|-

1950 births
21st-century American politicians
21st-century American women politicians
County commissioners in Texas
Democratic Party members of the United States House of Representatives from Texas
Female members of the United States House of Representatives
Hispanic and Latino American members of the United States Congress
Hispanic and Latino American state legislators in Texas
Hispanic and Latino American women in politics
Living people
People from Jim Wells County, Texas
People from Houston
Texas Southern University alumni
Democratic Party Texas state senators
Texas Woman's University alumni
Thurgood Marshall School of Law alumni
Women state legislators in Texas
American politicians of Mexican descent
Hispanic and Latino American judges